Bizarre was a British alternative magazine published from 1997 to 2015. It was published by Dennis Publishing and was a sister publication to Fortean Times.

History
Bizarre was launched as a bimonthly title by John Brown Publishing in February 1997 and was edited by Fiona Jerome. It was an immediate success and changed to monthly issuance a year after its launch. Circulation peaked at more than 120,000 in 2000, but later the same year declined to less than 30,000 when I Feel Good (IFG) bought the magazine for £5 million. IFG was a company founded by James Brown, the former editor of Loaded magazine. When IFG collapsed, Dennis Publishing acquired Bizarre. The  editor of Bizarre became David McComb in December 2013. Bizarre announced the end of publication in early 2015, with the January issue, published on 20 January, being its last.

On 28 February 2020 it was announced, via the magazine's social media pages, that Bizarre was in the early stages of making its return, both physically and online, under entirely new ownership. To date, no further details have been announced regarding the magazine's reboot.

Content

Bizarre covered alternative culture through interviews with counterculture personages, and articles about the Occult, LGBT culture and drug, fetish and other subcultures. It also reviewed the work of avant-garde directors, musicians, authors and visual artists.

The magazine's news coverage included unusual news events from around the world; development and impact of legislation concerning censorship, civil liberties, sex offences and occasionally, incidents of human rights abuses. Articles in Bizarre examined the Manchester police's Operation Spanner of 1987, Regulation of Investigatory Powers Act 2000,  British legislation banning "extreme pornography" and the Terrorism Act 2000. After the murder of Sophie Lancaster in 2007, Bizarre campaigned for awareness of bigotry against people who exhibit some form of cultural deviance.

Like lad mags, issues of Bizarre commonly featured a semi-nude female model on the front cover and reviews of weird gadgets, films, music and websites.

Pornography

Earlier issues of Bizarre included a sealed section featuring censored pornography, in which images of anuses, genitalia, semen and sex acts were obscured. The censorship was self-imposed to avoid alienating mainstream newsagent's shops and booksellers.

References

Further reading 

1997 establishments in the United Kingdom
2015 disestablishments in the United Kingdom
Cultural magazines published in the United Kingdom
Defunct magazines published in the United Kingdom
Fetish magazines
Lifestyle magazines published in the United Kingdom
Magazines established in 1997
Magazines disestablished in 2015
Pornographic magazines published in the United Kingdom